Megachile albolineata is a species of bee in the family Megachilidae which was discovered in Cameron in 1897.

References

Albolineata
Insects described in 1897